The 2001 Hamlet Cup was a men's tennis tournament played on outdoor hard courts at the Hamlet Golf and Country Club in Commack, New York in the United States and was part of the International Series of the 2001 ATP Tour. It was the 21st edition of the tournament and ran from August 20 through August 26, 2001. Sixth-seeded Tommy Haas won the singles title.

Finals

Singles

 Tommy Haas defeated  Pete Sampras 6–3, 3–6, 6–2
It was Haas' 2nd title of the year and the 3rd of his career.

Doubles

 Jonathan Stark /  Kevin Ullyett defeated  Leoš Friedl /  Radek Štěpánek 6–1, 6–4
It was Stark's only title of the year and the 21st of his career. It was Ullyett's 2nd title of the year and the 12th of his career.

Hamlet Cup
Connecticut Open (tennis)
2001 in American tennis
2001 in sports in Connecticut